Ninth Street Bridge may refer to:

 Ninth Street Bridge (Ocean City, New Jersey)
 Ninth Street Bridge (Pittsburgh, Pennsylvania), listed on the National Register of Historic Places in Allegheny County, Pennsylvania
 Ninth Street Bridge (Boise, Idaho), listed on the National Register of Historic Places in Ada County, Idaho
 Ninth Street Bridge over the Gowanus Canal in New York City